The Cartier Champion Stayer is an award in European horse racing, founded in 1991, and sponsored by Cartier SA as part of the Cartier Racing Awards. The award winner is decided by points earned in group races plus the votes cast by British racing journalists and readers of the Racing Post and The Daily Telegraph newspapers.

Records
Most successful horse (4 wins):
 Yeats – 2006, 2007, 2008, 2009

Leading trainer (8 wins):
 Aidan O'Brien – Yeats (2006, 2007, 2008, 2009), Fame and Glory (2011), Leading Light (2014), Order of St George (2016, 2017)

Leading owner (8 wins):
 Sue Magnier – Yeats (2006, 2007, 2008, 2009), Fame and Glory (2011), Leading Light (2014), Order of St George (2016, 2017)

Winners

References

Horse racing awards